

The 1933 Australia rugby union tour of South Africa and Rhodesia was a series of 23 rugby union matches played by the Australia national team in 1933.

Australia played a total of 23 matches, with a 5-Test series v South Africa, who won three of the five games.

Touring party

The tour manager was Dr. W. F. ('Wally') Matthews, who had previously been the team manager for the AIF rugby team which played in The King's Cup in 1919. A squad of 29 players was selected for the tour – 15 from New South Wales, 11 from Queensland, and 3 from Victoria.

With exception of two of the Victorians, the team departed Sydney aboard the "Ulysses" on Anzac Day, 25 April 1933. The remaining two players, O. J. Bridle and D. Cowper joined the vessel at Melbourne after the Wallabies had played a match against a Victorian team.

The Wallabies touring party consisted of:
 Manager: Dr. W. F. Matthews (NSW)
Playing squad:

 Captain: Dr. A. W. Ross (NSW) 
 Vice-captain: S. J. Malcolm (NSW) 
 F. McPhillips (NSW)
 M. Grace (NSW)
 J. Kelaher (NSW)
 J. Young (NSW) 
 R. Biilmann (NSW) 
 C. Campbell (NSW)
 R. B. Louden (NSW) 
 W. Mackney (NSW) 
 A. Hodgson (NSW)
 G. V. Bland (NSW)
 W. H. Cerutti (NSW)
 E. W. Love (NSW)
 M. F. Morton (NSW)
 D. McLean (QLD)
 W. Warlow (QLD) 
 J. Steggall (QLD) 
 G Bennett (QLD) 
 J. Clarke (QLD) 
 M. White (QLD) 
 W. G. White (QLD) 
 G. Cooke (QLD) 
 J. Ritter (QLD) 
 B. Doneley (QLD) 
 E. Bonis  (QLD) 
 G. S. Sturtridge (VIC)
 D. Cowper (VIC) 
 O. J. Bridle (VIC)

Match summary 
Scores and results list Australia's points tally first.

Match details

First Test

Second Test

Third Test

Fourth Test

Fifth Test

Bibliography 
 

 The Sydney Morning Herald 
 Monday 26 April 1933 p 13
 Monday 5 June 1933 p 7
 Friday 9 June 1933 p 11
 Monday 12 June 1933 p 6 
 Tuesday 15 June 1933 p 13
 Monday 19 June 1933 p 6
 Thursday 22 June 1933 p 10
 Tuesday 29 June 1933 p 10
 Thursday 17 August 1933 p 10

 The Brisbane Courier 
 Monday 26 June 1933 p 10
 Monday 3 July 1933 p 7
 Monday 10 July 1933 p 7
 Thursday 13 July 1933 p 12
 Monday 24 July 1933 p 7
 Monday 31 July 1933 p 7
 Thursday 3 August 1933 p 16
 Wednesday 9 August 1933 p 4
 Monday 14 August 1933 p 7
 Monday 21 August 1933 p 7
 Monday 28 August 1933 p 11

 The Courier-Mail 
 Monday 4 September 1933 p 6
 Thursday 7 September 1933 p 6
 Monday 11 September 1933 p 8

References

Australia national rugby union team tours
Rugby union tours of South Africa
Australian Rugby Union
1933 in South African rugby union